Citheronioides is a genus of moths in the family Saturniidae first described by Claude Lemaire in 1988.

Species
Citheronioides collaris (W. Rothschild, 1907)

References

Ceratocampinae